Debby Barrett is a former Republican member of the Montana Legislature. She was elected for Senate District 36, representing the Dillon, Montana area, in 2008. She previously served 4 terms in the House of Representatives.

Barrett served as President of the Senate during the 2015-2016 session.

References

Living people
Year of birth missing (living people)
Republican Party Montana state senators
Republican Party members of the Montana House of Representatives
Presidents of the Montana Senate
Women state legislators in Montana
21st-century American politicians
21st-century American women politicians